Matthew 5:13 is the thirteenth verse of the fifth chapter of the Gospel of Matthew in the New Testament. It is part of the Sermon on the Mount, the first of a series of metaphors immediately following the Beatitudes.

Content
The text in Koine Greek is:

There is a variant reading in the Textus Receptus, which reads:

The translation of the King James Bible reads:

The World English Bible translates the passage as:

Parallels
The verse is paralleled in Mark 9:50; Luke 14:34–35 also has a version of this text similar to the one in Mark.

There are a wide number of references to salt in the Old Testament. Leviticus 2:13, Numbers 18:19, and 2 Chronicles 13:5 all present salt as a sign of God's covenant. Exodus 30:35, Ezekiel 16:4 and 43:24, and 2 Kings 2:21 all present salt as a purifying agent.

Salt as a metaphor
The exact meaning of the expression is disputed, in part because salt had a wide number of uses in the ancient world.

Salt was extremely important in the time period when Matthew was written, and ancient communities knew that salt was a requirement of life. It was most used as a preservative; this use was important enough that salt was sometimes even used as currency, from which the word salary originates. The most common interpretation of this verse is a reference to salt as a preservative, and to thus see the duty of the disciples as preserving the purity of the world.

Many fertilizers use salts in appropriate quantities. Robert H. Gundry and others note that salt was a minor but essential ingredient in fertilizer, and Gundry suggests that earth should be translated as soil, and the disciples are thus to help the world grow and prosper. George Shillington feels that the Greek word for salt here refers to the chemical agent used in ancient times to fertilize fields rather than the edible salt used to preserve meat or flavor foods, indicating that the disciples are to bring new life to the world. Alan Kreider expounds upon this idea and notes various sources which led him to share this interpretation. Willard Swartley states that by obeying the Golden Rule one becomes the fertilizing salt of the earth. Phil Schmidt also believes that the disciples are meant to stimulate growth and positively affect the world.

Schweizer notes that a common Jewish expression at the time was to call the Laws the "salt and the light" of the world, which may mean this section is an introduction to the discussion of Mosaic law that will soon commence. In the Rabbinic literature of the period salt was a metaphor for wisdom.

Salt also played role in ritual purity and all sacrifices had to contain salt. John Nolland argues that the many different uses of salt show its importance in the life of the period, and it is this importance of the disciples that is being referenced.

Ancient peoples sometimes put salt on the wicks of lamps to increase their brightness.

Losing saltiness
The issue of salt losing its flavour is somewhat problematic. Salt itself, sodium chloride, is extremely stable and cannot lose its flavour. France notes that Jesus was giving a lesson in moral philosophy and "not teaching chemistry"; to him, whether or not the proverbial image is factually accurate is of little relevance to the actual message of this verse. Nolland considers the impossibility of what is described as deliberate, it is counter to nature that salt lose its flavour, just as it is counter to God's will that the disciples lose faith.

The most common explanation for this is that what would have been called salt in that era was quite impure, containing a wide array of other compounds. The salt used in the area mostly came from mines around the Dead Sea and material extracted from that area demonstrates these same properties today. Gundry notes that some other explanations have been advanced. Salt was extremely valuable and unscrupulous merchants may have replaced the salt with other substances. For some purposes gypsum was added to salt, but this would erase its flavour and make it unfit for consumption.

Albert Barnes, in his Notes on the Bible (1834) says:
In eastern countries, however, the salt used was impure, or mingled with vegetable or earthy substances, so that it might lose the whole of its saltiness, and a considerable quantity of earthy matter remain. This was good for nothing, except that it was used to place in paths, or walks, as we use gravel. This kind of salt is common still in that country. It is found in the earth in veins or layers, and when exposed to the sun and rain, loses its saltiness entirely. Maundrell says, "I broke a piece of it, of which that part that was exposed to the rain, sun, and air, though it had the sparks and particles of salt, yet it had perfectly lost its savour. The inner part, which was connected to the rock, retained its savour, as I found by proof."

Additionally, William McClure Thomson in the nineteenth century says:

However, Anglican Bishop Charles Ellicott referred to Henry Maundrell's observation from the latter's travels, around 1690, and noted that Maundrell said he "found lumps of rock-salt there which had become  flavourless", adding that he was "not aware that this has been confirmed by recent travelers".

Schweizer notes that some early versions have this verse read "earth lose its salt" rather than "salt lose its flavour" and is thus an illustration of how important the disciples are to the world. Hill notes that there is an entirely different understanding, which is that Jesus was well aware that salt cannot lose its flavour and the message is that if the disciples remain true to their Christianity they will never lose their influence and importance.

Foolishness
The literal translation of the Greek , "loses its savour", is "becomes foolish". In Aramaic the same term is used for losing savour and becoming foolish. Some have speculated that "became foolish" is thus a mistranslation by someone who did not realize the dual meaning of the Aramaic. Gundry feels that the idea of foolish salt is such "utter nonsense" that no translator would ever make such a mistake; he feels it is more likely that the Semitic expression had been assimilated into Greek and that became foolish was an expression for losing savour. English language translators universally accept that the verse is talking about flavour rather than intelligence. Some scholars do feel that this may be wordplay related to the Rabbinic use of salt as a metaphor for intelligence.

Trodden under foot
Gundry notes that at the time garbage would have been disposed of by throwing it out into the street. This explains why once the salt is cast out it will be trodden under foot of men.

In culture
Matthew 5:13 is a very well-known verse; "salt of the earth" has become a common English expression. Clarke notes that the phrase first appeared in the Tyndale New Testament of 1525. The modern usage of the phrase is somewhat separate from its scriptural origins. Today it refers to someone who is humble and lacking pretension. Due to its fame it has occurred a number of times in art and popular culture, but as Siebald notes usually these are based on the secular understanding of the term. It has been the title of an important 1954 film, a John Godber play, a song on  The Rolling Stones' Beggars Banquet, and a non-fiction work by Uys Krige. Both Algernon Swinburne and D.H. Lawrence wrote poems by this name. In Middle English literature the expression had a different meaning somewhat closer to the scripture, mostly being used to refer to the clergy. This usage is found both in Chaucer's "The Summoner's Tale" and Piers Plowman.

Along with Matthew 5:14, this verse became the theme of World Youth Day 2002: "You are the salt of the earth [...] you are the light of the world".

Commentary from the Church Fathers

Chrysostom:

Hilary of Poitiers:

Saint Remigius:

Saint Remigius:

Jerome:

Pseudo-Chrysostom:

Saint Remigius:

Hilary of Poitiers:

Jerome:

Augustine:

Hilary of Poitiers:

Jerome:

Glossa Ordinaria:

Hilary of Poitiers:

Augustine:

See also
 Salt in the Bible
 Salt of the earth

References

05:13
History of salt